"One Goodbye in Ten" is a song by British singer-songwriter Shara Nelson, released in September 1993 as the second single from her first solo album, What Silence Knows (1993).

Critical reception
In his weekly UK chart commentary, James Masterton wrote, "Shara Nelson follows up July's No.19 hit "Down That Road" with a song which is a vast improvement on its predecessor. "One Goodbye in Ten" shows off her voice to dramatic effect, a ballad in the classic Motown sense, strings and all. If there was any justice this would be a massive hit. Sadly I fear most record buyers will be too insular to appreciate the brilliance of this track." Gavin Reeve from Smash Hits gave it four out of five, adding, "Once again Shara takes us down that road to a time when singers could actually sing and musical instruments didn't go bleep. A real jeans commercial of a record that holds your hand and whispers "come on, you know you want to". Mellow with a capital mmm..." Jonathan Bernstein from Spin remarked that Bob Stanley and Pete Wiggs from Saint Etienne contribute on the single, describing it as "almost perky" with its "early-60s Doris Troy pop-soul stylings."

Track listings
 European CD single (7243 8 80913 2 9)
 One Goodbye in Ten (album mix) – 4:09
 One Goodbye in Ten (Simon Law mix) – 5:17
 One Goodbye in Ten (Funky Ginger club mix) – 6:54
 One Goodbye in Ten (Underdog mix) – 5:13

 UK CD single (7243 8 80884 2 8)
 One Goodbye in Ten (album mix) – 4:09
 One Goodbye in Ten (Simon Law mix) – 5:17
 One Goodbye in Ten (Funky Ginger club mix) – 6:54
 One Goodbye in Ten (Original demo) – 5:13
 One Goodbye in Ten (Underdog mix) – 4:21

Charts

References

External links
 

1993 singles
1993 songs
Cooltempo Records singles
Shara Nelson songs
Songs written by Bob Stanley (musician)
Songs written by Pete Wiggs
Songs written by Shara Nelson